Tim the Tiny Horse at Large is a book of stories for children written and illustrated by comedian Harry Hill, and published in 2008. It is the sequel to Tim the Tiny Horse.

Plot summary
Tim is still small yet his responsibilities are growing larger. Whilst continuing to live in his matchbox stable, he falls in love with Fly's sister Chenille, is Best Horse at Fly's wedding, babysits for Mr and Mrs Fly's baby, and buys a loft style apartment cigarette box, using a five-pound cheque. Then, Tim goes to buy a pet greenfly, George, and has to face up to the responsibilities and tragedies of being a pet owner.

Characters
Tim the Tiny Horse – The main character
George the Greenfly – Tim's pet greenfly who later dies. 
George the Second – Tim's second pet greenfly
Fly – Tim's Best friend
Mrs. Fly – The pregnant spouse of Fly. 
Maggot – Fly's son. 
Chenille – Fly's sister. 
Fly's Mother – Fly's mother who sings at George's funeral. 
Fly's Grandma – Fly's grandmother who is living with Fly.

History
Tim the Tiny Horse at Large was released on September 4, 2008. It is also known as Tim the Tiny Horse 2.

References

External links
 Author's website
 The Tim the Tiny Horse at Large section on the author's website
 Tim the Tiny Horse at Large on Faber Children's Books website

2008 short story collections
2008 children's books
Children's short story collections
Fantasy short story collections
British children's books
Harry Hill
Faber and Faber books